The Shops at Kenilworth is a mall in Towson, Maryland. It has more than 30 stores. The mall opened in 1979 as the Kenilworth Bazaar. The original anchor stores were Stebbins Anderson and Hochschild Kohn's.

Other former tenants include an express location of the Maryland Motor Vehicle Administration, which closed on September 23, 2005, in favor of a new location elsewhere in Baltimore County, and a location of European clothing retailer Ulla Popken, which opened in 2000 and has since closed.

In 2008, the mall started to undergo a multimillion-dollar facelift. The mall managed to attract new tenants, despite a downturned economy that year.

In 2009, the mall celebrated its 30th anniversary, and stated that its retailers were doing well, despite the downturn in the economy.

In 2015, the new owners of the mall, Greenberg Gibbons, announced that they plan a massive renovation and expansion of the decades-old mall, including reconfiguration of the current retail space to give the mall street frontage on Kenilworth Drive. The expansion is planned on being completed by the summer of 2017. As part of the process, Stebbins Anderson has downsized to one floor, ultimately planning to occupy only the lower level of its former two-level space. Trader Joe's then plans to move its store from downtown Towson to the upper level in Spring 2017.

In 2019, longtime tenant Stebbins Anderson announced that it would be closing its store, which had downsized to a single floor in 2015, following the closure of its Ace Hardware store.

Owners
The mall has been under the following ownership:
Kenilworth Limited Partnership, an entity related to Towne Properties of Cincinnati (April 1994 to present)
Irvin C. Tillman, Sr. (February 1976 to April 1994)
Clark MacKenzie (developer)

External links
The Shops at Kenilworth official site
Towson Times article about mall's 30-year anniversary

References

Shopping malls in Maryland
Shopping malls established in 1979
Baltimore County, Maryland landmarks
Buildings and structures in Baltimore County, Maryland
Tourist attractions in Baltimore County, Maryland
Towson, Maryland
1979 establishments in Maryland